Vulcaniella caucasica is a moth of the family Cosmopterigidae. It is found in Asia Minor, the Caucasus, Armenia and Azerbaijan.

The wingspan is 8–10 mm. Adults have been recorded in June and July.

References

Moths described in 1986
Vulcaniella